Cameron Wurf (born 3 August 1983) is an Australian professional triathlete and road cyclist, who currently rides for UCI WorldTeam . He was a national champion and Australian representative rower – a 2004 Olympian who won a World Rowing U23 Championships title in 2003.

Career

Rowing
Born in Hobart, Wurf was educated at Hutchins School, Hobart where he took up rowing. He won the national Schoolboy Sculling title at the Australian Rowing Championships in 2001.

Aged eighteen Wurf first represented Australia in a coxless four at the 2001 Junior World Rowing Championships in Duisburg, Germany where the Australian four placed seventh. Then at the 2003 World Rowing U23 Championships in Belgrade he rowed in the lightweight coxless four to a gold medal victory.

From 2004 to 2006 Wurf was selected to represent Tasmania in the men's lightweight four contesting the Penrith Cup at the Interstate Regatta within the Australian Rowing Championships. All three of those Tasmanian crews were victorious

At the 2004 Athens Olympics Wurf contested the men's lightweight double scull and finished with a sixteenth placing. He continued to represent Australia at the highest level in rowing until 2006 competing at World Championships. At Gifu 2005 he raced the lightweight double scull to a twelfth place and at Eton Dorney 2006 he stroked a coxless pair to a fourth place in the final. It was Wurf's last representative rowing appearance.

Cycling
Wurf left the  team at the end of the 2012 season – having joined the squad at the start of the season – and joined  for the 2013 season.

In February 2015, after finishing third in the time trial at the 2015 Oceania Road Championships, Wurf announced that he would take a year out from his professional cycling career, explaining that he felt he had not found his niche in the sport.

Triathlon
During his time off Wurf competed in triathlon, finishing ninth overall and winning the 30–34 age group on his Ironman debut at Whistler in July 2015.

Wurf made his professional triathlon debut at the Ironman Asia-Pacific Championships in Cairns in June 2016. However, he only contested the Australian National Road Race Championships for the team.

In 2022, it was announced that Wurf would make his Super League Triathlon debut at SLT Malibu. Wurf finished 18th in the event, after being eliminated in stage 1, however has expressed interest in returning to Super League Triathlon in the future.

Return to cycling

Major results

2007
 1st Time trial, Oceania Games
 1st Chrono Champenois
 9th Overall Herald Sun Tour
2011
 5th Overall Tour of Turkey
2012
 2nd Overall Tour of Qinghai Lake
 4th Overall Tour of China II
 7th Overall Tour of Japan
2014
 2nd Overall Herald Sun Tour
 8th Overall Tour de Taiwan
2015
 Oceania Road Championships
3rd  Time trial
6th Road race

Grand Tour general classification results timeline

References

External links

Cameron Wurf profile at Liquigas-Cannondale

1983 births
Living people
Australian male cyclists
Cyclists from Tasmania
Sportspeople from Hobart
Olympic rowers of Australia
Rowers at the 2004 Summer Olympics
Australian male triathletes
Australian male rowers